Hayastan is the Armenian name for Armenia, a country in the South Caucasus region of Western Asia. 

Hayastan or Hayasdan may also refer to:

 Hayastan (daily), an Armenian public and political daily published 1917–1918 by General Andranik
 Hayastan (periodical), the multilingual organ and publication of the Armenian Secret Army for the Liberation of Armenia (ASALA)
 Hayastan All Armenian Fund, official name of Armenia Fund

See also
 Mayr Hayastan (Mother Armenia), a female personification of Armenia
 Nor Hayastan, independent Armenian language daily newspaper published in Glendale, California
 Yeritasard Hayastan, an Armenian-American socio-political and economical periodical published by the Social Democrat Hunchakian Party from 1903 until the 2000s